Essra Mohawk (born Sandra Elayne Hurvitz on April 23, 1948) is an American singer-songwriter who has recorded a dozen albums, many receiving critical acclaim.

Her best-known songs include "Sufferin' Til Suffrage" and "Interjections!" (both from Schoolhouse Rock!), "Change of Heart", recorded by Cyndi Lauper and "Stronger Than the Wind", recorded by Tina Turner.

Biography
Hurvitz was born in Philadelphia, Pennsylvania. Her first record, The Boy with the Way, credited as Jamie Carter, was issued on Liberty Records in 1964.  As Sandy Hurvitz, she was then discovered by Shadow Morton, who placed her songs with both the Shangri-Las ("I'll Never Learn") and the Vanilla Fudge ("The Spell That Comes After").   While living in New York City in 1967 she met Frank Zappa, who persuaded her to perform for a short time with The Mothers of Invention and then signed her to his Bizarre Records production company. While he initially helped to produce her first album, he left the project and assigned it to woodwind player and keyboardist Ian Underwood after finding out that a groupie (and Whisky a Go Go secretary) that he had slept with, Gail Zappa (then Gail Sloatman), was pregnant. After Hurvitz, who Zappa had casually been seeing, urged him to marry Sloatman, Zappa departed from the project. Hurvitz stopped performing with The Mothers of Invention soon after. She opened for Procol Harum when they performed at the Cafe Au Go Go in 1967, and Keith Reid wrote "Quite Rightly So", which appeared on their second album Shine On Brightly, for her. Her first album Sandy's Album Is Here At Last was released on Bizarre/Verve in December 1968.

In 1969 she was signed by Reprise Records after executive Mo Ostin discovered her singing at a club in New York.  The resulting album, Primordial Lovers, was later said to be "one of the best 25 albums ever made" in Rolling Stone magazine. The album featured contributions from CSN&Y drummer Dallas Taylor and former Rhinoceros members Doug Hastings and Jerry Penrod. Essra nearly joined Rhinoceros in its original line-up. While recording the album, she married her producer Frazier Mohawk (born Barry Friedman, 1941) and from then on was known as Essra Mohawk.  "Essra" (S-ra) is an abbreviated form of Sandra.  She was scheduled to perform at the Woodstock Festival in August 1969, but her manager missed a turn, resulting in them barely arriving before the end of the last act on Friday evening, too late to perform.

Members of Generation X may recognize her distinctive voice from the Saturday morning TV series Schoolhouse Rock!, as she lent her voice to "Interjections!", "Mother Necessity" and "Sufferin' Till Suffrage" in the mid-1970s. In addition, Mohawk sang the theme song to "Teeny Little Super Guy", a regular segment on Sesame Street during the 1980s.

Her third, eponymous, album came out on Asylum Records in 1974. It was panned by Village Voice critic Robert Christgau, who wrote in Christgau's Record Guide: Rock Albums of the Seventies (1981): "Here is a vocalist who should throw away all her Leon Russell records. When she calls herself a 'full-fledged woman,' it sounds like 'pool player's' woman, which given her persona makes more sense." The next album, Essra, was released on yet another label, Private Stock, in 1976.  During that period, she also worked as a session and background singer, for John Mellencamp and Carole King, and later she performed with the Jerry Garcia Band, and recorded and arranged background vocals for Kool & the Gang. In 1982 after recording another album in L.A., she worked with McFadden and Whitehead in Philadelphia, penning "Not With Me" for their Capitol album, Movin' On.  She released another solo album, E-Turn, before Cyndi Lauper had a hit with her song "Change of Heart" in 1986.

In 2011 she provided the lead vocal for an animated short film produced by TDA Animation, about the struggle for gay rights, called "Sufferin' Till You're Straight". The spot featured former Supremes Scherrie Payne and Susaye Greene on background vocals.

She has written songs for other artists including co-writing a song entitled "Infinite Eyes" with blues artist Keb Mo as well as recording and performing in concert. She has released six more albums since moving to Nashville in 1993. Essra's songs have been aired on the TV series Joan of Arcadia and the soap opera All My Children. Rhino released a special limited edition of her second and third albums, Primordial Lovers MM, in 2000. Mohawk has been a longtime advocate of peace and environmental protection. She is a member of the board of Musicians and Artists for Peace and is their Nashville coordinator.

Discography

Studio albums
1968 Sandy's Album is Here at Last (as Sandy Hurvitz)
1970 Primordial Lovers
1974 Essra Mohawk
1976 Essra
1982 Burnin’ Shinin’ (released without knowledge of the artist)
1985 E-Turn
1995 Raindance
1999 Essie Mae Hawk Meets the KillerGrooveBand
2003 You’re Not Alone
2006 Love is Still The Answer
2007 Revelations of the Secret Diva

Live albums
2001 Essra Live at Genghis Cohen

Compilations
2005 Mama Kangaroos: Philly Women Sing Captain Beefheart.  Performs "Party of Special Things To Do," backed by the Philadelphia band EDO.
2013 Four-beat Rhythm: The Writings of Wilhelm Reich

References
Donovan, Charles. "[ Essra Mohawk]". Allmusic Guide.

External links
 Official website
 2003 interview
Essra Mohawk Interview NAMM Oral History Library (2019)

Living people
Musicians from Philadelphia
1948 births
Singer-songwriters from Pennsylvania
Jerry Garcia Band members
The Mothers of Invention members